Stefano di Francesco (died 1427) was an Italian (Florentine) painter, who probably died young, as he left a five-year-old son, and was outlived twenty years by his father-in-law, the painter Giuliano Pesello (1367–1446).  His son was the painter Francesco Pesellino (1422–1457), the most distinguished of the three.  Nothing is known of Stefano di Francesco's painting.

References 
 Corti, Gino and Frederick Hartt, Documents, The Art Bulletin, Vol. 44, No. 2 (Jun., 1962), 155–167.
 Vasari, Giorgio, Le Vite delle più eccellenti pittori, scultori, ed architettori, many editions and translations.

15th-century Italian painters
Italian male painters
1427 deaths
Painters from Florence
Year of birth unknown